KBTV may refer to:

KBTV currently refers to 
 KBTV-TV, a television station (channel 4) licensed to Port Arthur, Texas, United States
 KBTV-CD, a television station (channel 51) licensed to Sacramento, California, United States

KBTV previously referred to 
 KBTV, the callsign of WFAA from 1949 to 1950, a television station (channel 8) licensed to Dallas, Texas (USA)
 KBTV, the callsign of KUSA from 1952 to 1984, a television station (channel 9) licensed to Denver, Colorado, United States

Other uses 
 The ICAO code for Burlington International Airport in Burlington, Vermont, United States